Athletes from the Islamic Republic of Iran competed at the 1988 Summer Olympics in Seoul, South Korea. The nation returned to the Olympic Games after missing both the 1980 and 1984 Summer Olympics.

Competitors

Medal summary

Medal table

Note: Demonstration sports indicated in italics.

Medalists

Results by event

Athletics 

Men

Cycling

Road 

Men

Track 

Men

Wrestling 

Men's freestyle

Men's Greco-Roman

Demonstration sports

Taekwondo 

 
Men

References

External links
Official Olympic Reports
International Olympic Committee results database

Nations at the 1988 Summer Olympics
1988
Olympics Summer